Kevin Ambalwa (born 29 May 1989) popularly known as Kayvo Kforce, is an African hip hop artist from Nairobi, Kenya and currently based in Kenya. He released a diss track 'Kill A King' which disses all the Kenyan hip hop artistes.

Early life 
Kayvo Kforce was born in one of the biggest slums in Africa, Kibera, Nairobi.

Kayvo Kforce's interest in music began when he was just 8 years old singing in a local Church choir. He started acting when he was in high school and took music seriously when he finished his High school studies.

Career 
In 2008, Kayvo Kforce was the youngest rapper to grace the rap scene and soon after his music group 'K-Force'. He decided to go solo on his music career. He had a mentor who molded him into a writer and sharpened his flows. Kayvo Kforce decided to rap because Kibera by then had no notable Hip hop artistes, so he saw this as an opportunity to put his ghetto on the map the best way i know how. He has worked with producers in the game like Tedd Josiah and Ambrose and also worked with East African musicians like Solo Thang, Kalamashaka, K-South, Chiwawa, Khaligraph Jones, Smallz Lethal, Abbas and many other Kenyan artistes.

Kayvo is also keen on giving back to the community as he went to Dandora to show love and support to the youth there to help them become the best in life through music and mentorship to them. He has collaborated with artistes like Maluda (musician), Octopizzo, Khaligraph Jones, Zj Heno, Lon Jon and also was a part of the Coke Studio Africa Cypher where he shared the stage with M.I Abaga, Nazizi, Khaligraph Jones and Bamboo. In 2021 he dropped one of the biggest Hip Hop album dubbed 'Namba Nane Drill'

Discography

References

External links 
 

1989 births
Living people
Kenyan rappers
Musicians from Nairobi